Haneen is a given name. Notable people with the name include:

 Haneen Ibrahim (born 2000), Sudanese swimmer
 Haneen Zoabi (born 1969), Palestinian-Israeli politician
 Haneen Zreika (born 1999), Australian rules footballer

See also
 Hanin (disambiguation)
 Henein, surname
 Henin, surname